Belonoglanis tenuis is a species of loach catfish found in the Congo Basin where it occurs in the Congo River basin.  It reaches lengths up to 17.2 cm.

Species Information

Size 
The Belonoglanis tenuis usually measures at around 17 centimeters.

Identification 
There is a single row of bony plates from the dorsal fin to the caudal peduncle on the top of the fishes body. The Belonoglanis tenuis is long and thin. They are toothless.

References 
 
 https://www.aquaticrepublic.com/common/species.php?species_id=360

Amphiliidae
Congo drainage basin
Taxa named by George Albert Boulenger
Fish described in 1902